The Apica River is a freshwater tributary of the Pikauba River, flowing in the unorganized territory of Lac-Ministuk, in the Le Fjord-du-Saguenay Regional County Municipality, in the administrative region of Saguenay–Lac-Saint-Jean, in the province of Quebec, in Canada.

The Apica River flows through a narrow, steep valley. Visitors can admire the panorama from a rest area located a few kilometers north of the route 169 bridge over it. This river turns out to be the outlet of a series of small aligned lakes, located to the south, Lake Micoine constituting its head. The lake of the same name is located to the southwest of Mount-Apica; however, this lake is integrated into the watershed of the rivière aux Écorces.

The upper part of the Apica valley is accessible by the route 169 (route d'Iberville); other secondary forest roads have been developed in the sector for forestry and recreational tourism activities.

Forestry is the primary economic activity in the sector; recreational tourism, second.

The surface of the Apica River is usually frozen from late November to early April, however safe circulation on the ice is generally from mid-December to late March.

Geography 
The Apica River intersects the route 169 connecting Quebec (city) to Lac Saint-Jean, halfway between Jacques-Cartier Lake and the northwest limit of the Laurentides Wildlife Reserve. The main watersheds adjacent to the Apica River are:
 north side: Pikauba River, Félix stream, Damasse stream, Suzor Côté lake, Petite rivière Pikauba;
 east side: Pikauba River, Lac Godin, Petite rivière Pikauba, Cyriac River;
 south side: Mignault Lake, Madeleine Creek, Pikauba River, Rivière aux Écorces North-East;
 west side: Rivière aux Écorces, Lake Paris, Jacqueline Lake.

The Apica River rises at the mouth of Lake Micoine. The mouth which is on the north shore of this head lake is located at:
  south-west of a curve in the course of the Pikauba River;
  east of the source of the rivière aux Canots;
  north-east of rivière aux Écorces North-East;
  south-west of route 169;
  south-east of the confluence of the Apica river and the Pikauba River;
  south-east of the confluence of the rivière aux Canots Est and the Rivière aux Canots.

  north-west crossing Mitchell Lake over its full length, up to its mouth. Note: Mitchell Lake is contiguous to Micoine Lake and has a bay extending  to the southeast on the west shore. A breakwater is built at the mouth on the northwest bank;
  towards the north-west notably by crossing Lake Lemay to its mouth. Note: About 90% of the area of this lake constitutes a marsh area;
  north-west, to the outlet (coming from the south-west) of Lake Dagenay;
  north-west, to the outlet (coming from the south-west) of Molson Lake;
  towards the north, meandering, to the outlet (coming from the northeast) of Lac du Lédon;
  towards the north by forming a loop towards the east by crossing the zone of the old village of Mont-Apica, until route 169;
  north, to its mouth.

The Apica river flows on the west bank of the Pikauba River. This confluence is located at:

  north-east of route 169;
  north of the village center of Mont-Apica;
  north-west of the junction of route 169 and route 175;
  south-east of the confluence of the Pikauba River and Kenogami Lake;
  south-west of the confluence of the Chicoutimi River and the Saguenay River;
  south-east of the shore of lac Saint-Jean.

Toponymy 
The Dictionary of Rivers and Lakes of the Province of Quebec (1914 and 1925) calls this stream "Upika River". The toponymic designation of this river appears under the spelling "Upica" on the map of the province of Quebec by Eugène Taché (1870), in Studies by Stanislas Drapeau on the developments of the colonization of Lower Canada (1863), and in an 1850 report from the Commissioner of Crown Lands, JH Price, with the spelling "Upika". The Innu term "upica" means "it is constricted" when speaking of a watercourse. This term could also mean "carrying strap", according to an interpretation known formerly. Long used, the name "Upica" was changed in 1961 to "Apica" as was the new designation "Mount Apica". This mountain then acquired a certain notoriety following the installation, nearby, of a radar station, today disused.

The toponym "Apica river" was formalized on June 6, 1973, at the Place Names Bank of the Commission de toponymie du Québec.

See also 
 Le Fjord-du-Saguenay Regional County Municipality
 Lac-Ministuk, a TNO
 Pikauba River
 Kenogami Lake
 Chicoutimi River
 Saguenay River
 St. Lawrence River
 List of rivers of Quebec

References 

Rivers of Saguenay–Lac-Saint-Jean
Le Fjord-du-Saguenay Regional County Municipality